Aaron Sherman Watkins (November 29, 1863 – February 9, 1941), born in Ohio, was a president of Asbury College in Kentucky. Before his ordination as a Methodist minister, he practiced law with his brother. He was the grandfather of Prohibition candidate for Vice President of the United States, W. Dean Watkins.

Long dedicated to promoting the temperance movement, Watkins served as Prohibition Party candidate for various political offices. These included:
Prohibition candidate for US Representative of Ohio 9th District, 1904
Prohibition candidate for US Vice President, 1908 & 1912
Prohibition candidate for US President, 1920

Watkins received honorary degrees of Bachelor of Science, Master of Science, Doctor of Laws, Doctor of Divinity, Doctor of Humane Letters and Doctor of Philosophy.

See also
Prohibition Party presidential election results

External links
Aaron Watkins (1863-1941)

|-

1863 births
1941 deaths
20th-century American politicians
Activists from Ohio
Methodists from Ohio
Ohio Prohibitionists
Presidents of Asbury University
Prohibition Party (United States) presidential nominees
Prohibition Party (United States) vice presidential nominees
Candidates in the 1920 United States presidential election
1908 United States vice-presidential candidates
1912 United States vice-presidential candidates